Hey, Taxi! is a 1925 American silent comedy film featuring Oliver Hardy.

Cast
 Bobby Ray as Taxi driver
 Oliver Hardy as A rival taxi driver (as Babe Hardy)

See also
 List of American films of 1925

External links

1925 films
1925 short films
American silent short films
American black-and-white films
1925 comedy films
Silent American comedy films
American comedy short films
1920s American films